Araeomolis rubens is a moth of the family Erebidae. It was described by William Schaus in 1905. It is found in French Guiana, Venezuela, Peru, Suriname and the Brazilian state of Amazonas.

Description
The forewing measures  and, on its upperside, is chocolate brown mixed with white-grey speckles that lie along the costa and both sides of the crimson veins; the underside of the forewing is paler, and its veins are striped with crimson. The hindwing is crimson, grading to a paler colour costally. The antennae are brownish, and have crimson stripes on the posterior region.

References

Phaegopterina
Moths described in 1905
Moths of South America